The School of Advanced Warfighting (SAW) in the United States Marine Corps is an Advanced Intermediate Level School (A-ILS) that produces officers qualified to fill high-impact service and joint planning billets.  The curriculum features numerous case studies, multiple planning exercises, extensive staff rides, and a consideration of future war. Graduates earn the secondary Military Occupational Specialty (MOS) 0505 Marine Air Ground Task Force (MAGTF) planner and a Masters Degree in Operational Studies. SAW was designed to develop field grade officers for the Marine Corps most difficult operational and planning challenges.

SAW is located in Warner Hall aboard Marine Corps Base Quantico, Virginia. Warner Hall is named in honor of Senator John Warner.

History
The School of Advanced Warfighting (SAW) can trace its roots back to the “maneuver warfare movement,” the period leading up to and including General Alfred M. Gray Jr’s tenure as the 29th Commandant, which reached fever pitch with the publishing of Fleet Marine Force Manual 1 Warfighting in 1989. General Gray’s vision for a “world-class educational institution for the study of war and the profession of arms” within the Marine Corps Command and Staff College (CSC) would consist of the Art of War Studies program, which later became the Marine Corps War College, and a new second-year of CSC which developed into SAW. During this same time, these courses, along with Amphibious Warfare School, the predecessor to the Expeditionary Warfare School, were organized into the Marine Corps University.

Similar to the U.S. Army’s School of Advanced Military Studies, the plan called for a new course to be offered as a follow-on year to CSC. The goal was to enable selected students the opportunity to gain a greater appreciation of military art from an academic perspective. Gray, having recently read Stormtroop Tactics: Innovation in the German Army, 1914-1918, tapped its author, Bruce Gudmundsson, a Marine Corps Reserve captain who was working as a case study writer at the John F. Kennedy School of Government, to develop the initial course. The result was a graduate-level military education program designed to amplify and complement the warfighting foundations provided during the first year of the CSC curriculum while specifically focusing on the link between warfighting and combat development.

SAW formally began on July 10, 1990, with an initial class composed of twelve Marine Corps Officers and two officers from the U.S. Army and the U.S. Air Force. These students, selected by the Director of CSC, volunteered for the additional year of school beyond their CSC graduation. Lieutenant Colonel James Eicher assumed the office of Dean of SAW under the CSC Director, and Dr Bradley J. Meyer, a German military historian, was brought on as the additional professor beside Dr Gudmundsson. 

Over the thirty following years, SAW separated from CSC to form an independent school, broadened the prerequisite requirement to attend resident CSC to any intermediate-level resident or non-resident school, opened the application process to international military students and U.S. Government agencies, and increased class size from sixteen to twenty-six students. The program has changed from a course to train combat developers into a course to develop staff planners for service in critical billets throughout the operating forces and supporting establishments.

Mission
The School of Advanced Warfighting (SAW) develops lead planners and future commanders with the will and intellect to design and execute joint campaigns and naval expeditionary operations.

It educates officers who will serve as staff planners in key billets throughout the operating forces and supporting establishments with the following program goals.

Formulate solutions to complex problems and apply operational art in an uncertain geostrategic security environment. 
Employ knowledge of the operational level of war, the art of command, and ethical behavior in warfighting. 
Quickly and critically assess a situation, determine the essence of a problem, fashion a suitable response, and concisely communicate the conclusion in oral and written forms. 
Demonstrate the competence, confidence, character, and creativity required to plan, lead, and command at high level service, joint, and combined headquarters. 
Design and plan adaptive concepts to meet current and future challenges.

It provides advanced intermediate-level school, and graduate-level professional military education for selected field grade officers who have completed the Marine Corps or sister service command and staff college course. The course develops complex problem solving and decision making skills that can be used to improve the warfighting capabilities of an organization at the operational level of war.

The curriculum is administered through a 48-week resident program consisting of 42 credit hours in the following core courses:
Operational Art
Operational Planning
Changing Character of Conflict

Graduates are awarded a Master of Operational Studies degree by the President of the Marine Corps University. The degree is accredited by the  Southern Association of Colleges and Schools.

Cates Award
The General Clifton B. Cates Award is presented in honor of the 19th Commandant of the Marine Corps by the Navy League to the two SAW students whose sustained demonstration of problem-solving capabilities far exceed their military experience and are considered most outstanding as exhibited by written assignments, participation in practical exercises, and in the exchange of ideas.

Previous Directors
Lieutenant Colonel James Eicher, USMC, AY 1991, as "Dean of SAW"
Colonel John Goodman, USMC, AY 1992-1993, as "Head of SAW"
Colonel Joseph Crookston, USMC, AY 1994-1996
Colonel Rex Estilow, USMC, AY 1997-1998
Lieutenant Colonel John Bacon, USMC, AY 1999-2002, Class of 1992
Colonel John Koenig, USMC, AY 2003-2004, Class of 1997
Colonel Christopher Owens, USMC, AY 2005, Class of 1997
Colonel Jerome Driscoll, USMC, AY 2006-2007, Class of 2001
Colonel Christopher Woodbridge, USMC, AY 2008, Class of 2001
Colonel James Vohr, USMC, AY 2009, Class of 2002
Colonel Tracy King, USMC, AY 2010, Class of 2003
Colonel David Casey, USMC, AY 2011, Class of 2002
Colonel Michael Morris, USMC, AY 2012-2015, Class of 2001
Colonel Wayne Sinclair, USMC, AY 2016-2018, Class of 2004
Colonel James Fullwood Jr, USMC, AY 2019-2020, Class of 2007

Notable Graduates
General John Kelly, USMC (Ret.), Class of 1992 and former White House Chief of Staff
General Kenneth McKenzie Jr., USMC, Class of 1993
General David Berger, USMC, Class of 1996 and 38th Commandant of the Marine Corps
Lieutenant General Steven Hummer, USMC (Ret.), Class of 1992
Lieutenant General Mark Brilakis, USMC (Ret.), Class of 1996
Lieutenant General Jon Davis, USMC (Ret.), Class of 1996
Lieutenant General Robert Mood, Norwegian Army (Ret.), Class of 1996
Lieutenant General Carl Mundy III, USMC, Class of 1999
Lieutenant General Richard Burr, Australian Army, Class of 1999
Lieutenant General George Smith Jr., USMC, Class of 2000
Major General Charles Gurganus, USMC (Ret.), Class of 1992
Major General Robert Castellvi, USMC, Class of 1999
Major General William Mullen, USMC, Class of 2002

See Also
 School of Advanced Military Studies
 School of Advanced Air and Space Studies
 Marine Corps War College

References

Educational institutions established in 1990

United States Marine Corps schools
1990 establishments in Virginia